Lesson's seedeater (Sporophila bouvronides) is a bird species in the family Thraupidae (formerly in Emberizidae).

It is found in Bolivia, Brazil, Colombia, Ecuador, French Guiana, Guyana, Panama, Peru, Suriname, Trinidad and Tobago, and Venezuela. Its natural habitats are subtropical or tropical moist shrubland and heavily degraded former forest.

Description
The Lesson's seedeater is a small, sparrow-like bird around 10.5-11cm. Males have a mostly black head with large white whisker mark; females have an olive-brown back and pale yellowish belly with a dull yellow bill.

Behavior and Ecology
Most of Lesson's seedeaters are found in open marshlands and disturbed habitats with long grass, especially near water and are at times seen in flocks, feeding on grass seeds. Their natural habitats are subtropical or tropical moist shrubland and heavily degraded former forest. Most are similar to lined seedeaters, but male Lesson’s lacks a white stripe on its crown while females of the two species are identical and not safely identified unless accompanied by males. Females are best told from other seedeaters (except lined seedeaters) by strong yellowish wash on underparts and relatively small, dull yellow bill.

References

Lesson's seedeater
Birds of Colombia
Birds of Venezuela
Birds of Trinidad and Tobago
Birds of the Guianas
Lesson's seedeater
Taxonomy articles created by Polbot